Carmen Elisa Rodallega (born 15 July 1983) is a Colombian footballer who plays as a full back for Atlético Huila. She has been a member of the Colombia women's national team.

Career
Born in Cali, Rodallega began playing football in her neighbourhood and joined Escuela Carlos Sarmiento Lora at age 17.

Rodallega has played as a striker for the senior Colombia women's national football team, featuring as Colombia finished as runners-up in the 2010 Sudamericano Femenino and helping her team qualify for its first ever FIFA Women's World Cup finals.

She also played at the 2012 Olympics. After Colombia were beaten in all three group matches Rodallega criticised a lack of support from the association. She also supported the team's coach over the controversial omission of Yoreli Rincón, stating that Rincón had arrived at the tournament in poor condition.

Personal life
Carmen's cousin Hugo Rodallega played football in England for Wigan and Fulham. She has one daughter.

References

External links
 
 
 Carmen Rodallega – FIFA World Cup profile

1983 births
Living people
Women's association football fullbacks
Colombian women's footballers
Footballers from Cali
Colombia women's international footballers
2011 FIFA Women's World Cup players
Olympic footballers of Colombia
Footballers at the 2012 Summer Olympics
Atlético Huila footballers
Afro-Colombian women